Thomas Fasbender (born 13 March 1957 in Gummersbach, North Rhine-Westphalia) is a German journalist and author. He reports mainly for RT DE.

Life
Thomas Fasbender studied law and later switched to philosophy. He joined the Corps Borussia Bonn in 1979. In 1986, he completed his PhD at the University of Bayreuth with a thesis on Thomas Carlyle. After a newspaper traineeship in Lower Bavaria, he was promoted to political and economic editor. He worked as press officer for a trade fair company and as assistant to the CEO with an electrical equipment multinational.

For the same company Fasbender moved to Moscow in 1992. He was involved in the restructuring and liquidation of joint ventures founded during Soviet times. As managing director of a Russian subsidiary, he set up local production facilities. In 1999 he became self-employed as partner in a spinning and weaving mill on the Volga. In Moscow he operated a corporate fleet management company.

In 2008, Fasbender took up writing again. In 2015 he returned to Berlin, where he has been working as journalist and author. He writes for Die Weltwoche, Sputnik et al. From 2016 to 2018 he advised the Berlin-based Dialogue of Civilizations Research Institute. Fasbender is committed to improve Germany-Russia relations.

He is married and has 5 children.

Broadcasting
In his RT DE 15-minute, at times sarcastical weekly format Fasbenders Woche he comments on a wide range of political subjects. His talk show format Fasbender im Gespräch presents German-speaking personalities such as Norbert Häring, Roland Koch, Haralampi G. Oroschakoff, Roger Köppel, Hans-Joachim Frey, Maria Zakharova, Georg Pazderski, Tuvia Tenenbom, Dieter Stein, Alexander Neu, Billy Six and others. This cooperation with RT ended with the 2022 Russian invasion of Ukraine. Since then, Fasbender has been running a private YouTube channel entitled Zu ende gedacht.

Book publications
 Das unheimliche Jahrhundert. Vor der Zeitenwende,  Manuscriptum Verlagsbuchhandlung, Landt Verlag, 2022, 
 Wladimir W. Putin. Eine politische Biographie, Manuscriptum Verlagsbuchhandlung, Landt Verlag, 2022, 
 Die AfD und die Klimafrage, Ed. Konrad Adam, Gerhard Hess Verlag, 2019, 
 Kinderlieb, Roman, Lichtschlag Reihe Literatur, 2016, 339 Seiten
 Freiheit statt Demokratie. Russlands Weg und die Illusionen des Westens, Manuscriptum Verlagsbuchhandlung, 2014, 
 Thomas Carlyle: Idealistische Geschichtssicht und visionäres Heldenideal, Königshausen u. Neumann, 1989,

References

External links

 

1957 births
Living people
German male journalists
German journalists
German newspaper journalists
German male writers
20th-century German journalists
21st-century German journalists
RT (TV network) people